Deception was to be the last album released by the British new wave band The Colourfield. During the recording of the album Karl Shale left during the sessions. Terry Hall has since voiced his displeasure with the recording of the album because he did not feel he had the control of the session musicians and producers the way he needed to preserve The Colourfield’s sound.

Release
Deception was much less successful than its predecessor Virgins and Philistines, and only reached #95 in the UK. It was promoted by two singles, both cover versions. The first, "Running Away", a cover of the Sly and the Family Stone hit, made #84, and the second single, "She" (originally performed by The Monkees) didn't chart at all.

In 2010, the album along with Virgins and Philistines was re-released on CD in the UK by Cherry Red Records with additional bonus tracks.

Track listing
All tracks written by Terry Hall and Toby Lyons; except as indicated.

Personnel
The Colourfield
 Terry Hall - all instruments and voices
 Toby Lyons - all instruments and voices
Additional personnel
Gregg Mangiafico – keyboards
Sammy Merendino – drum programming
Roland Orzabal - guitar on "Running Away" and "Confession"
Dolette McDonald, Deborah Malone, Janice Pendarvis - backing vocals on "Digging It Deep"

References

1987 albums
The Colourfield albums
Albums produced by Richard Gottehrer
Chrysalis Records albums